Karima Benameur Taieb (born 13 April 1989) is a French professional footballer who plays as a goalkeeper and the France national team.

Club career
Benameur Taieb played for Toulouse FC and Rodez AF before joining Paris Saint-Germain F.C. in 2012. Franck Raviot has been her most inspiring coach. In 2015, she moved to French club FCF Juvisy, (later renamed Paris FC) who compete in the Division 1 Féminine.

In 2019 Benameur Taieb made the first international move of her career, signing a one-year contract with English FA WSL side Manchester City.

International career
Benameur Taieb was called up to be part of the national team for the UEFA Women's Euro 2013.

Personal life
Formerly known as Karima Benameur, Benameur Taieb announced in June 2020 that she would now adopt her mother's surname and sport Taieb on the back of her shirt.

Career statistics

Club
.

International

Honours

Club
Paris Saint-Germain F.C.
Runner-up
 Division 1 Féminine: 2012–2013, 2013–2014, 2014–2015

Manchester City
 FA Women's League Cup: 2021–22

Notes

References

External links
 Karima Benameur Taieb at Footofeminin.fr 
 
 
 
 Karima Benameur Taieb at fussballtransfers.com 
 Karima Benameur Taieb at soccerdonna.de 
 
 

1989 births
Living people
French Muslims
French women's footballers
France women's international footballers
CNFE Clairefontaine players
AS Saint-Étienne (women) players
Rodez AF (women) players
Toulouse FC (women) players
Montpellier HSC (women) players
Paris Saint-Germain Féminine players
Paris FC (women) players
Manchester City W.F.C. players
Division 1 Féminine players
French sportspeople of Algerian descent
French sportspeople of Moroccan descent
People from Bédarieux
Women's association football goalkeepers
Sportspeople from Hérault
Footballers from Occitania (administrative region)